Paolisi is a comune (municipality) in the Province of Benevento in the Italian region Campania, located about 35 km northeast of Naples and about 20 km southwest of Benevento.

References

Cities and towns in Campania